The 4th Cavalry was a cavalry regiment of the British Indian Army.

Origin 
Raised in 1838 in the service of the Nawab of Avadh the various changes and amalgamations are listed below.

History 
Converted in 1840 to the East India Company service as the 6th Bengal Irregular Cavalry.

They were granted an Honorary Standard for service in Sind in 1844, hearing the device of a lion 'passant regardant'.

As part of the 1861 reforms it was add to the regular establishment as the 4th Regiment of Bengal Cavalry

The 4th's first battle honour was Afghanistan NWF 1879-80 for service during the Second Afghan War.

They went through four changes of title between 1900 and 1904, initially owing to the regiment being rearmed with the lance.

By the outbreak of war in 1914 they were stationed at Bareilly.

In August 1914 they were mobilised as the divisional cavalry regiment of the 7th (Meerut) Division, landing in France in October 1914

In November 1915 they left the front and entrained for Marseilles, however they did not sail until the end of December. They were transferred to Mesopotamia, arriving in January 1916. They were transferred to serve with the 6th Indian Cavalry Brigade. They left Mesopotamia and returned to India in late 1917.

In late 1920 the 4th Cavalry were sent to Palestine on occupation duties, not returning to India until January 1922. At Bombay in April 1922 they amalgamated with the 2nd Lancers (Gardner's Horse) to form the 2nd - 4th Cavalry. However this title was short-lived and the new unit was retitled 2nd Lancers (Gardner's Horse) by October 1922.

Titles 
1837 1st Regiment Oudh Light Auxiliary Force Horse
1840 6th Bengal Irregular Cavalry
1861 4th Regiment of Bengal Cavalry
1900 4th Regiment of Bengal Lancers
1901 4th Bengal Lancers
1903 4th Lancers
1904 4th Cavalry
1922 Amalgamated with 2nd Lancers (Gardner's Horse), to initially form 2nd-4th Cavalry then 2nd Lancers (Gardner's Horse)

See also

 4th Horse (Hodson's Horse), an armoured regiment of the Indian Army
 4th Cavalry (Pakistan), an armoured regiment of the Pakistan Army

References

Bibliography
 Kempton, C (1996). A Register of Titles of the Units of the H.E.I.C. & Indian Armies 1666-1947. Bristol: British Empire & Commonwealth Museum. 
  
 Nath, A (2009) Izzat. Historical Records and Iconography of Indian Cavalry Regiments 1750-2007. 
 
 Indian Army List, various dates

Military units and formations established in 1838
British Indian Army cavalry regiments
Indian World War I regiments
Honourable East India Company regiments
1838 establishments in India